Long period ground motion is ground movement during an earthquake with a period longer than 1 second.  The frequency of such waves is 1 Hz or lower, placing them in the infrasonic part of the audio spectrum.

See also
Love wave
S-wave
P-wave
Rayleigh wave
Transverse wave
Seismic microzonation

References

Seismology